Polokwane United Football Club is a South African Association Football club based in Polokwane, South Africa, which competes in the SAB Regional League. The academy was established in 2012 however the club started competing in the SAFA Second Division during the 2014/15 season after purchasing the rights from Rospa United FC. The Club boasts its own training centre located on a 15 hectare plot in Makotopong, north east of Polokwane.

History

The club was established in 2012 by Bally Smart .

The Academy

The Academy caters for sports development and also provides the opportunity to gain educational qualifications. Each week incorporates intensive sports training, together with competitions, as well as learning about other aspects of the sports. The students attend school at various partnered institutions during the morning and mid-afternoon followed by training in the late afternoon. The Academy is of a residential nature with on-site accommodation, meals and student welfare included and is highly supervised and run to a professional standard.

The Training Centre

Located in Makotopong, 26 kilometres outside of Polokwane, Polokwane United Training Centre has 3 full size pitches, and on-site accommodation for staff as well as academy players. The facility was opened in January 2022.

Club Officials

 Development Manager:  Allan Ramoba
 Welfare & Education Officer:  Joseph Sibanda
 Head of Housekeeping:  Rebecca Makhubela

First Team Squad
As of 1 March 2023'

Under 19 SquadAs of 01 October 2022''

Notable former players

References

http://www.soccerladuma.co.za/news/articles/categories/south-africa/smart-s-academy-outsmart-dikwena-youngsters/132924

http://www.premiercup-bayhill.co.za/tournament-news-item.php?news-id=699

http://www.linmedia.co.za/news/23130/polokwane-united-on-target-again

External links
 http://www.polokwaneunitedfc.co.za

Association football clubs established in 2012
SAFA Second Division clubs
Soccer clubs in South Africa